Cy Feuer (January 15, 1911 – May 17, 2006) was an American theatre producer, director, composer, musician, and half of the celebrated producing duo Feuer and Martin. He won three competitive Antoinette Perry Awards for Excellence in Theatre, and a Lifetime Achievement Tony Award. He was also nominated for Academy Awards as the producer of Storm Over Bengal and Cabaret.

Career

Born Seymour Arnold Feuerman in Brooklyn, New York, he became a professional trumpeter at the age of fifteen, working at clubs on weekends to help support his family while attending New Utrecht High School. It was there he first met Abe Burrows, who in later years he would hire to write the book for Guys and Dolls.

Having no interest in mathematics, science, or sports, he dropped out of school and found work as a trumpeter on a political campaign truck. He later studied at the Juilliard School before joining the orchestras at the Roxy Theater and later Radio City Music Hall.

In 1938, he toured the country with Leon Belasco and His Society Orchestra, eventually ending up in Burbank, California. Following a ten-week stint there, the orchestra departed for Minneapolis, but he opted to remain in California.

Feuer found employment at Republic Pictures, serving as musical director, arranger, and/or composer of more than 125 mostly B-movies, many of them serials and westerns, for the next decade, save for a three-year interruption to serve in the military during World War II.

During his Hollywood sojourn, he enjoyed a tumultuous one-year affair with actress Susan Hayward (also from Brooklyn), worked with Jule Styne, Frank Loesser, and Victor Young, among others, received five Academy Award nominations for his film scores, and married a divorcée, Posy Greenberg, a mother of a three-year-old son. The couple later had a son of their own named Jed.

In 1947, having decided he had no real talent for film scoring, Feuer returned to New York City, where he teamed up with Ernest H. Martin, who had been the head of comedy programming at CBS Radio. After an aborted attempt to stage a production based on George Gershwin's An American in Paris, they produced Where's Charley?, the 1949 Frank Loesser adaption of Charley's Aunt. Although it was panned by six of the seven major New York critics, positive word-of-mouth about the show, particularly Ray Bolger's star turn in it, kept it running for three years.

Over the next several decades, Feuer & Martin mounted some of the most notable titles in the Broadway musical canon, including Guys and Dolls and How to Succeed in Business Without Really Trying, both of which won the Tony Award for Best Musical. As of 2007, How to Succeed... is one of only seven musicals to have won the Pulitzer Prize for Drama. Feuer and Martin owned the Lunt-Fontanne Theatre from 1960 to 1965.

Feuer was also a stage director. Among his Broadway directing credits were Little Me and the ill-fated I Remember Mama.

As a film producer, Feuer's most successful venture was his 1972 adaptation of Kander & Ebb's 1966 musical Cabaret. The movie was nominated for 10 Academy Awards and went to win eight Academy Awards, but Feurer lost Best Picture to The Godfather, giving Cabaret the distinction of the most Oscar-honored film to lose the top prize. As the movie's producer, Feuer won a Golden Globe for Best Musical or Comedy. With Martin, he was responsible for the 1985 screen adaptation of A Chorus Line, which proved to be one of their biggest flops.

Feuer's memoir, I Got The Show Right Here: The Amazing, True Story of How an Obscure Brooklyn Horn Player Became the Last Great Broadway Showman, written with Ken Gross, was published by Simon & Schuster in 2003.

Death
Feuer served as president, and later chairman, of the League of American Theatres and Producers (now called The Broadway League) from 1989 to 2003. He died on May 17, 2006, of bladder cancer in New York City, aged 95.

Additional Broadway credits
 Can-Can (1953)
 The Boy Friend (1954)
 Silk Stockings (1955)
 Whoop-Up (1958)
 Hamlet (1964)
 Skyscraper (1965)
 Walking Happy (1966)
 The Act (1977)
 I Remember Mama (1979)

Awards and nominations

Selected filmography
 Storm Over Bengal (1938) - nominated for an Academy Award
 Woman Doctor (1939)
 Sis Hopkins (1941) (with Susan Hayward,  Bob Crosby and the Bobcats band; songs by Frank Loesser and Jule Styne )
 Sons of the Pioneers (1942)
 Man from Cheyenne (1942)
 Cabaret (1972) - nominated for the Academy Award for Best Picture
 Piaf (1974)

References

Sources

External links
 TonyAwards.com Interview with Cy Feuer

1911 births
2006 deaths
Deaths from bladder cancer
American theatre directors
American male composers
American trumpeters
American male trumpeters
Broadway theatre directors
Broadway theatre producers
Musicians from Brooklyn
American theatre managers and producers
American autobiographers
Deaths from cancer in New York (state)
First Motion Picture Unit personnel
20th-century trumpeters
20th-century American composers
20th-century American male musicians
New Utrecht High School alumni
Military personnel from New York City
Special Tony Award recipients
Tony Award winners